The songkok or peci or kopiah is a cap widely worn in Brunei, Indonesia, Malaysia, Singapore, the southern Philippines, and southern Thailand, most commonly among Muslim males. It has the shape of a truncated cone, usually made of black or embroidered felt, cotton or velvet. It is also worn by males in formal occasions such as weddings and funerals or festive occasions such as the Eid ul-Fitr and Eid al-Adha holidays. In Indonesia, the peci is also associated with the nationalist movement.

Names

It is called "songkok" in Sumatra and the Malay Peninsula. While in Java, it is called "kopiah" or "kopeah". It is also known widely in Indonesia as "peci", although peci has a more ellipse shape and sometimes decorated.

Origin

Kopiah (kupiah) is recorded as being used by Majapahit elite troops (Bhayangkara), recorded in the Hikayat Banjar, written in or not long after 1663. Kopiah is recorded in Pigafetta's Italian-Malay vocabulary of 1521 (published 1524) as cophia. Kupiah is recorded in Hikayat Iskandar Zulkarnain, the original text was written before 1600 AD:Maka tatkala memeliharakan disuruhnya anaknya memakai perhiasan seperti pakaian laki-laki dan dikenakan kepada kepalanya kupiah ros yang keemasan. (So when he took care of his son, he ordered him to wear jewelry like men's clothes and put on his head a golden rosary kupiah.)One Brunei newspaper account erroneously states that the songkok became a norm in Malay Archipelago in the 13th century with the coming of Islam in the region. The earliest written mention of the word songkok is in Syair Siti Zubaidah (1840). While traditional triangular Malay headress of Tengkolok or destar is associated with traditional Malay nobles and royalties, songkok on the other hand has become part of traditional Malay men's costume associated with Islam, traditionally worn by local ulamas.

The Royal Malay Regiment of the Malaysian Army have been using the songkok as part of their uniform since under British rule.

Current use

Traditionally, songkok is usually associated as a cap worn by Muslim men, during religious or formal state occasions. However, in Indonesia, the songkok has become the national headress with secular nationalist connotations made popular by Sukarno. Numbers of Indonesian nationalist movement activist in early 20th century wore peci such as Sukarno, Mohammad Hatta, and Agus Salim. However, as the first president of Indonesia it was Sukarno that popularised peci — more precisely plain black velvet peci — as national men's cap of Indonesian, and Indonesian male presidents have worn peci as part of their official presidential attire ever since. Indonesian official palace guards also wore peci as part of their uniform. The Paskibraka (Indonesian: pasukan pengibar bendera pusaka) or flag raising squad in Indonesian independence day ceremony also wear peci, and there is even female peci version with curved back. The Betawi people wear the Songkok as their traditional headdress usually colored dark red. Catholic and Protestant Betawi of Kampung Sawah regularly wear peci as part of traditional attire during church service.

In Malaysia, traditional male Malay attire consists of a songkok, shirt, matching pants, and waist wrap that is called a baju melayu. In a Dewan Undangan Negeri (State Legislative Assemblies) or in Dewan Rakyat (Parliament), all members (regardless of race or religion) within the legislative assembly, are required to wear the songkok (with a gold middle stripe) as a formal custom, at every State Customary Opening of Parliament (or respective State Legislative Assemblies), held once annually, in order to comply with the dress code of each legislative assembly opening. This is done to ensure decorum whenever the respective Head of State (Yang di-Pertuan Agong for the Parliament of Malaysia, respective Sultans or Yang diPertua Negeri for each State Legislative Assemblies) is present to open the legislative assembly proceedings for the year. Similarly, all recipients of honorific orders bestowed by either the Yang di-Pertuan Agong (for federal honorific orders) or the Sultan (for each respective state honorific orders), are required to wear the gold-striped songkok along with the official customary attire in Malaysia, to receive their honorific orders in person.

In Singapore, the songkok is not allowed to be worn in government schools, as part of the school uniform, as Singapore is officially a secular state and all religious headgear is not allowed to be worn. It is part of the standard uniform at madrasahs (Islamic religious schools).

In the Philippines, the songkok, known as kopiah or kupya, plays a role in the heraldry of the Sultanate of Sulu, and is part of the traditional wear of Bangsamoro men. It is part of the traditional formal clothing of Muslim Filipino men in general, along with a local Mindanaoan variation of the Baju Melayu and native malong (sarung). Some non-Muslim Lumad Filipino datu also wear the kopiah, as a result of being historically influenced by the fashions and customs of Muslim Filipinos. The kopiah is worn by Muslim Filipino men throughout the archipelago as a formal cap for prayers, and for religious and social functions. Kopiah with gold-string embroidery, or cuts of inaul or fabric with okir designs are gaining popularity alongside the conservative black velvet version. A red and white checkered Saudi-style ghutrah worn draped over a kopiah is a traditional indicator in the Southern Philippines of a hajji or male pilgrim who has been to Makkah as part of the hajj.

Gallery

See also 

 Dhaka topi
 Gandhi cap
 Fez (hat)
 Tengkolok
 Yarmulke

References

External links

Caps
Malay clothing
Malaysian culture
Philippine clothing
Indonesian clothing
History of Asian clothing
Oceanian culture